Ken Levine may refer to:
 Ken Levine (game developer) (born 1966), American video game designer and founding member of Irrational Games
 Ken Levine (screenwriter) (born 1950), American writer, director and producer in the television and film industry